Keeping Mum is a 2005 British black comedy film co written and directed by Niall Johnson and starring Rowan Atkinson, Kristin Scott Thomas, Maggie Smith and Patrick Swayze. It was produced by Isle of Man Film, Azure Films and Tusk Productions, and was released in the United Kingdom on 2 December 2005, by Summit Entertainment.

Plot
When a young pregnant woman named Rosie Jones (Emilia Fox) boards a train, her enormous trunk starts leaking blood in the luggage compartment.

Questioned by the police about the dead bodies inside, Rosie calmly reveals they are her unfaithful husband and his mistress. Convicted of manslaughter, she is imprisoned in a unit for the criminally insane due to diminished responsibility.

Forty three years later, Walter Goodfellow (Rowan Atkinson), the village vicar of Little Wallop, is very busy writing the perfect sermon for a convention. He's completely oblivious to his family's problems: his wife, Gloria (Kristin Scott Thomas), has unfulfilled emotional/sexual needs and starts an affair with her golf instructor, Lance (Patrick Swayze); his teenage daughter, Holly (Tamsin Egerton), has a growing sex drive and physical maturity and constantly changes boyfriends; and his son, Petey (Toby Parkes), is a victim of bullying at school.

New housekeeper, Grace Hawkins (Maggie Smith), becomes involved in their lives, learning about their problems: neighbour Mr. Brown's Jack Russell terrier Clarence barks non-stop, preventing Gloria from sleeping; Petey has bullies; and Gloria has an affair with Lance.

Grace sets out to solve the problems in her own way by killing Clarence as well as Mr. Brown, sabotaging the brakes on the bullies' bicycles which injures one of them and killing Lance with a flat iron outside the house for videotaping Holly undressing one night.

As Walter prepares the sermon for the conference, Grace suggests adding humour. Also, seeing he has let his relationship slide due to his devotion to God, she shows him he can love his wife and God by looking at the erotic references in the Song of Solomon. As the problems in the household seem to gradually clear, Walter leaves for his convention.

Gloria and Holly see Grace's photo on the news, showing her release and previous offences, and they begin to realise what she's done. It is revealed that 'Grace' is Gloria's long-lost mother Rosie Jones, who's come to meet her. After briefly processing the flood of information, Gloria asserts that when having a problem with someone, one cannot just kill them.

Grace mentions this is the point she and her doctors could never agree on. Despite their disagreements, Gloria tries to help Grace with Lance's body, but cannot handle it. Over a cup of tea, the three women decide not to tell Walter or Petey any of what has happened.

Nagging congregant Mrs. Parker (Liz Smith) visits to discuss the problem of the "church's flower arranging committee". Grace, erroneously believing Mrs. Parker is about to turn them in for her crimes, attempts to hit her with a frying pan but Gloria stops her. Mrs. Parker, shocked, has a heart attack and dies. Walter returns from the convention just then and sees Mrs. Parker's body, but not realizing she is dead. Soon after, Grace leaves the family when order is seemingly restored among them.

Walter then talks to Bob and Ted, the waterworks employees, who say there is too much algae and the vicar's pond needs to be drained. Remembering Grace's victims' bodies are in the pond, Gloria, with a strained smile, offers them some tea.

The film ends with an underwater shot depicting the bodies that had been placed in the pond, including the recently added Bob and Ted.

Cast
 Rowan Atkinson as Reverend Walter Goodfellow
 Kristin Scott Thomas as Gloria Goodfellow
 Maggie Smith as Rosie Jones/Grace Hawkins
Emilia Fox as Young Rosie Jones
 Patrick Swayze as Lance
 Tamsin Egerton as Holly Goodfellow
 Toby Parkes as Petey Goodfellow
 Liz Smith as Mrs. Parker
 James Booth as Mr. Brown 
 Patrick Monckton as Bob
 Rowley Irlam as Ted
 Vivienne Moore as Mrs. Martin
 Murray McArthur as the Vicar's Convention Master of Ceremonies
 Roger Hammond as The Judge

Production
Principal photography began in February 2005. The main filming location was in the village of St Michael Penkevil in Cornwall. Locations on the Isle of Man were used for all filming outside the village. The outer shots of the train is on the North Yorkshire Moors Railway, the scene with the car going over a small bridge with the train going over another is just outside Goathland (Aidensfield in Heartbeat).

Reception
Review aggregator website Rotten Tomatoes reported that 56% of critics gave the film positive write-ups based on 87 reviews, with an average rating of 5.9/10. The site's critical consensus reads, "The stellar cast, including Kristin Scott Thomas and Dame Maggie Smith, is certainly an asset, but this black comedy is too uneven." On Metacritic, the film received an average score of 53 out of 100 based on 22 critics, indicating "mixed or average reviews".

When the film was originally released in the United Kingdom, it opened at #4, behind Harry Potter and the Goblet of Fire, Flightplan and The Exorcism of Emily Rose. It retained the same spot the following weekend.

References

External links

 
 
 
 
 
 Keeping Mum – Keeping Mum – Original Soundtrack by Dickon Hinchliffe Album

2005 films
2005 black comedy films
2005 comedy-drama films
British black comedy films
British comedy-drama films
Films shot in Cornwall
Films about death
Films about murderers
Summit Entertainment films
2000s English-language films
2000s British films